Nicolás Escartín Ara (born August 19, 1980, in Huesca, Aragón) is a male double's badminton player from Spain. He won multiple significant competitions. He was recognised for his achievements by being recognised as the most successful Aragonese athlete of 2006.

Major achievements

References

1980 births
Living people
People from Huesca
Sportspeople from the Province of Huesca
Spanish male badminton players